Penetrants, or penetrating items, are the mechanical, electrical or structural items that pass through an opening in a wall or floor, such as pipes, electrical conduits, ducting, electrical cables and cable trays, or structural steel beams and columns.  When these items pierce a wall or floor assembly, they create a space between the penetrant and the surrounding structure which can become an avenue for the spread of fire between rooms or floors. Building codes require a firestop to seal the openings around penetrants.  

Passive fire protection
Building engineering
Firestops